Hering is a German surname. Notable people with the surname include:

 Armin Hering (born 1957), German radio journalist and former foreign correspondent
 Constantine Hering (1800–1880), German-born pioneer of homeopathy in the United States
 Daniel Webster Hering (1850–1938), American physicist 
 Erich Martin Hering (1893–1967), German entomologist 
 Ewald Hering (1834–1918), German physiologist
 Frank E. Hering (1874–1943), American football player and coach
 Gottlieb Hering (1887–1945), German Nazi SS extermination camp commandant
 Harold Hering (born 1936), American former officer of the U.S. Air Force
 Henry Hering (1874–1949), American sculptor
 Joshua W. Hering (1833–1913), American politician, physician and banker
 Jutta Hering (1924–2011), German film editor
 Jutta Hering-Winckler (born 1948), German lawyer and patron of music
 Kathleen Hering, German bobsledder 
 Kristof Hering (born 1989), German singer
 Loy Hering (1484–1564), German Renaissance sculptor
 Mandy Hering (born 1984), German handball player
 Jeanie Hering, pseudonym of Marion Jean Catherine Adams-Acton (1846–1928), Scottish novelist
 Robert Hering (born 1990), German sprinter
 Rudolph Hering (1847–1923), civil engineer

See also
Haring (surname)
Häring
Surnames from nicknames

German-language surnames